Talal Salem Alnuaimi (born September 26, 1988 in Dubai) is a United Arab Emirates professional basketball player. He is a member of the United Arab Emirates national basketball team.

Al-Nuaimi competed for the United Arab Emirates national basketball team for the first time at the FIBA Asia Championship 2009. Despite being only 20 years old at the tournament, he averaged 10.8 points per game and led the team in minutes per game in helping the UAE to a 12th-place finish, their best showing since 2001.

References

1988 births
Living people
Emirati men's basketball players
Sportspeople from Dubai
Basketball players at the 2006 Asian Games
Point guards
Shooting guards
Asian Games competitors for the United Arab Emirates